Hysen Memolla (born 3 July 1992) is an Albanian professional footballer who plays as a left back for Albanian club Egnatia Rrogozhinë    and the Albania national team.

Club career

Early career
Born in Kavajë, Albania, Memolla moved to Apulia, Italy at the age of one with his parents. He started training football in his hometown Pezze di Greco, before moving to the youth ranks of ASD Esperia in nearby Monopoli. In 2010 he moved to the academy of A.S. Martina Franca 1947, recently promoted to Eccellenza. The following year, he joined the first-team squad, now in fifth-tier Serie D and featured in the squad that achieved another promotion, to Lega Pro Seconda Divisione. After two further seasons in the fourth-tier, Memolla signed a contract with the Serie A side Hellas Verona.

Hellas Verona and loans
Memolla wouldn't feature for the first-team however, partly due to non-EU citizenship. He was sent immediately back on loan to Martina Franca, now in third-tier Lega Pro.

His next loan would be of a higher profile as he moved on loan to the Slovenian top-tier side FC Koper. He played in 17 matches for the club, scoring twice, but did not feature after mid-March 2016.

Hajduk Split
He signed as a free agent for HNK Hajduk Split on 4 July 2016, after passing successfully a trial. Memolla made his Hajduk debut in a Round 3 Prva HNL match against RNK Split at Park Mladeži in a 0-1 win for Hajduk. His contract was prolonged for two further years after he established himself as a first-team player.

Salernitarna
Memolla did not feature in a single game in the 2018-19 season after being replaced in the starting line up by André Fomitschow and Domagoj Bradarić. He was eventually moved to Hajduk's 2nd team and placed on transfer list. On 24 January 2019, he terminated his contract with Hajduk and joined the Serie B side Salernitana.

KPV
On 12 August 2019, he moved to Finland and signed with KPV.

Diósgyőr
Half year later, he signed to Hungary with Diósgyőr.

Lahti
On 21 January 2022, he returned to Finland and signed with Lahti for the 2022 season.

International career
Memolla received his first international call up at the Albania national under-21 football team by coach Skënder Gega for a 3 days testing from 7–10 May 2012.

Albania senior side
Following his good form at Hajduk Split mostly in the 2017–18 UEFA Champions League qualifying phase and play-off round, progressing through 3 rounds and qualifying for play-off, Memolla received his first call for the Albania senior team by newly appointed coach Christian Panucci for the 2018 FIFA World Cup qualification matches against Liechtenstein and Macedonia on 2 and 5 September 2017. He was an unused substitute against the former and made his debut against the later, coming on as a substitute in the 73rd minute in place of national team's captain, Ansi Agolli.

Career statistics

Club

International

References

External links

 Hysen Memolla profile at FSHF.org

1992 births
Living people
Footballers from Kavajë
Albanian footballers
Association football fullbacks
A.S. Martina Franca 1947 players
FC Koper players
HNK Hajduk Split players
U.S. Salernitana 1919 players
Kokkolan Palloveikot players
Diósgyőri VTK players
FC Lahti players
Serie B players
Serie C players
Slovenian PrvaLiga players
Croatian Football League players
Veikkausliiga players
Nemzeti Bajnokság I players
Albania youth international footballers
Albania under-21 international footballers
Albania international footballers
Albanian expatriate footballers
Albanian expatriate sportspeople in Italy
Expatriate footballers in Italy
Albanian expatriate sportspeople in Slovenia
Expatriate footballers in Slovenia
Albanian expatriate sportspeople in Croatia
Expatriate footballers in Croatia
Albanian expatriate sportspeople in Finland
Expatriate footballers in Finland
Albanian expatriate sportspeople in Hungary
Expatriate footballers in Hungary